"Headlights" is a song by German DJ and record producer Robin Schulz. It features the vocals from American singer and songwriter Ilsey. The song was released in Germany as a digital download on 3 April 2015 as the lead single from his second studio album Sugar (2015). The song has peaked at number 6 on the German Singles Chart. The song was written by Robin Schulz, Ilsey Juber, John Ryan, Andreas Schuller, Eric Frederic, Tom Peyton and Joe London. The original demo version included a sample of an acoustic guitar taken from a sample library, which was replayed for the official release by Mark Summers at Scorccio Sample Replays.

Music video
A music video to accompany the release of "Headlights" was first released onto YouTube on 3 April 2015 at a total length of three minutes and forty-nine seconds. The video features a small group of pool-goers in an abandoned waterpark in Algarve, Portugal. The people do water-related stunts in the empty pools. The video ends with a couple posing with, and then driving off in a Toyota Aygo, with the numberplate "AYGO8".

Track listing

Chart performance

Weekly charts

Year-end charts

Certifications

Release history

References

2015 songs
2015 singles
Robin Schulz songs
Songs written by John Ryan (musician)
Songs written by Axident
Songs written by Ricky Reed
Songs written by Ilsey Juber
Tropical house songs
Songs written by Joe London
Songs written by Robin Schulz